I'll Close My Eyes is a 1991 studio album by Mark Murphy.

Reception

The Allmusic review by Scott Yanow described Murphy's recordings for Muse Records as "...among the most rewarding of his career", adding that "His eccentric improvising is an acquired taste worth gaining...An interesting outing that sounds quite contemporary while tied to the jazz tradition." The All About Jazz reviewer wrote: "I'll Close My Eyes is a classic and should be a part of every serious jazz lover's CD collection."

Track listing
 "I'll Close My Eyes" (Buddy Kaye, Billy Reid) – 5:36
 "If" (David Gates) – 3:19
 "Happyin'" (Flip Nunez) – 4:06
 "Miss You Mr. Mercer" (Duncan Lamont, Jack Segal) – 5:05
 "Small World" (Reuben Brown) – 3:09
 "There Is No Reason Why" (Patti Linardos) – 3:42
 "Time on My Hands" (Harold Adamson, Mack Gordon, Vincent Youmans) – 4:05
 "Ugly Woman" (Howlett Smith) – 5:07
 "Not Like This" (Jeremy Lubbock) – 2:46

Personnel
Mark Murphy – vocals
Larry Fallon – arranger, producer
David Finck – double bass
Peter Grant – drums
Jay Messina – engineer
John Basile – guitar
Cliff Carter – keyboards
Sammy Figueroa – percussion
Pat Rebillot – piano
Claudio Roditi – trumpet

References

1991 albums
Mark Murphy (singer) albums
Muse Records albums